Ernest W. Seaholm High School (simply referred to as Seaholm High School) is a Magnet high school in Birmingham, Michigan, United States. It was established in 1951 and is part of the Birmingham Public Schools district.

History

Seaholm opened in 1951 under the name Birmingham High. At the time, the Board of Education President was Ernest W. Seaholm (retired Chief Engineer for Cadillac) and the treasurer was Wylie E. Groves. Birmingham's two high schools are now named for them: Seaholm High School and Groves High School. Birmingham High School's first principal was Ross Wagner. John Schulz served as the next principal (1968–1979), Jim Wallendorf followed, serving from 1979 to 1992.

At one time Seaholm High School hosted classes of grades 4 through 12 of the Japanese School of Detroit, a supplementary Japanese school. In 2010, the JSD announced that it was relocating to Novi, Michigan; it moved in mid-2011.

Programs
The Forensics Team has consistently enjoyed success at the state-finalist level. Quiz Bowl team has also had success, winning a national championship in 1991 at the American Scholastics Competition Network Tournament of Champions and a state championship in 1994.

The student newspaper, the Seaholm Highlander, has won multiple prestigious Spartan Awards from the Michigan Interscholastic Press Association.

The Flexible Scheduling Program, which involved a seven teacher team that created a series of interdisciplinary social studies/humanities courses with flexible schedules, began in the 1960s. They may be taken in lieu of standard English and social studies classes. Students are permitted to teach courses themselves. According to the Christian Science Monitor, the reduction in bureaucracy, interaction and collaboration between teachers, the interdisciplinary nature, and flexible time schedules made the program attractive.

Notable alumni
 Tim Allen, actor and comedian
 Jim Benton, illustrator and writer
 Mike Binder, film director, screenwriter, producer, and actor
 Randal Bryant, computer scientist and academic
 Charlie Burg, singer-songwriter
 Daniel L. Doctoroff, businessman and former government official
 Patrick Grant, composer
 Troy Hairston, fullback for the Houston Texans
 Jordan Harbinger, radio personality, podcaster, voice actor, journalist, lawyer and businessman
 Beth Hayes, (1955–1984), economist
 Laura Innes, actress and television director
 Haley Kopmeyer, professional soccer player
 Christine Lahti, actress and filmmaker
 Mari Manoogian, politician
 Haley Stevens, politician
 Paul Stookey, singer-songwriter

See also
International Academy

References

External links

 
 The Flex Program

High schools in Oakland County, Michigan
Public high schools in Michigan
Educational institutions established in 1951
1951 establishments in Michigan